Desmond Bagley (29 October 1923 – 12 April 1983) was an English journalist and novelist known mainly for a series of bestselling thrillers. He and fellow British writers such as Hammond Innes and Alistair MacLean set conventions for the genre: a tough, resourceful, but essentially ordinary hero pitted against villains determined to sow destruction and chaos for their own ends.

Biography
Bagley was born in Kendal, Westmorland – now in Cumbria – as the son of John and Hannah Bagley. His family moved to the resort town of Blackpool in the summer of 1935, when Bagley was 12. Leaving school not long after the move, Bagley worked as a printer's assistant and factory worker, and during the Second World War in the aircraft industry. Bagley had a stutter all of his life, which initially exempted him from military conscription.

Bagley left England in 1947 for Africa and worked his way overland, crossing the Sahara Desert and briefly settling in Kampala, Uganda, where he contracted malaria. By 1951, he had settled in South Africa, working in the gold mining and asbestos industries in Durban, Natal, before becoming a freelance writer for local newspapers and magazines. While there he met a local bookstore director, Joan Margaret Brown, whom he married in 1960.

In an afterword to his novel Windfall, Bagley describes how as a freelancer for the Johannesburg Sunday Times, he witnessed the 1960 assassination attempt against South African PM Hendrik Verwoerd.

When not travelling to research the exotic backgrounds for his novels, Bagley enjoyed sailing, loved classical music, films and military history, and played war games.

Bagley and his wife left South Africa for England in 1964, where they lived in Bishopsteignton, Devon. They settled in Totnes, Devon, from 1966 to 1976, and then moved to Guernsey until his death in 1983. Thereafter his wife continued to live there until her death in 1999.

Bagley died on 12 April 1983 at a hospital in Southampton of complications resulting from a stroke. He was 59.

Writings
Bagley's first published short story appeared in the English magazine Argosy in 1957, and his first novel, The Golden Keel, in 1963. Between whiles he was a film critic for The Rand Daily Mail in Johannesburg from 1958 to 1962.

The success of The Golden Keel had led Bagley to turn to full-time novel writing by the mid-1960s. He produced a total of 16 thrillers, all craftsman-like and almost all bestsellers. Typically of British thriller writers of that period, he rarely used recurring characters in different books. Exceptions include Max Stafford (a security consultant featured in Flyaway and Windfall), Slade (a spy who appeared in Running Blind and The Freedom Trap), and Metcalfe (a smuggler/mercenary in The Golden Keel and The Spoilers). His work yielded five mostly unremarkable film adaptations: The Freedom Trap (1971), released in 1973 as The Mackintosh Man by Warner Brothers, directed by John Huston and starring Paul Newman and Dominique Sanda; Landslide, made for television in 1992; The Vivero Letter, filmed in 1998; and The Enemy, starring Roger Moore in 2001. Probably the most successful adaptation was Running Blind, serialised for television by the BBC in 1979.

In several novels Bagley used the first-person narrative. One critic wrote, "As long as meticulous craftsmanship and honest entertainment are valued, and as long as action, authenticity, and expertise still make up the strong framework of the good adventure/thriller, Desmond Bagley's books will surely be read."

Bagley also published short stories. His last two novels, Night of Error and Juggernaut, were published posthumously after completion by his wife. His works have been translated into over 20 languages.

In 2017, an unpublished first-draft manuscript entitled Because Salton Died was discovered among his papers at the Howard Gotlieb Archival Research Center in Boston, Massachusetts. A complete final draft was subsequently prepared by writer Michael Davies, which was retitled Domino Island and published by HarperCollins on 9 May 2019.

Also discovered among the author's papers was an incomplete and unpublished draft manuscript entitled Writer – An Enquiry into a Novelist. In 2021 this autobiographical account of Bagley's early life and formative influences was edited and published, as a free eBook, by Philip Eastwood.

At the Frankfurt Book Fair in October 2022, HarperCollins announced they had acquired Bagley's catalogue from Brockhurst Publications, which had previously been responsible for managing the author's estate. Alongside the deal, publisher David Brawn revealed that a new original novel, written by Michael Davies as a 'sequel' to Domino Island, would be published as a centenary tribute to Bagley. The novel, entitled Outback, is scheduled for publication on 11 May 2023.

Bibliography
The dates are for the first UK hardcover publication; all Bagley's novels subsequently appeared in paperback.

References

Further reading

External links
 Fan site with photos and summaries
 The Bagley Brief: A website about the craftsmanlike thriller Novelist Desmond Bagley /en
 

1923 births
1983 deaths
British thriller writers
People from Kendal
Writers from Totnes
20th-century British novelists
British expatriates in Uganda
British expatriates in South Africa